27 Aquilae (abbreviated 27 Aql) is a star in the equatorial constellation of Aquila. 27 Aquilae is its Flamsteed designation though it also bears the Bayer designation d Aquilae. It has an apparent visual magnitude of 5.49, which is faintly visible to the naked eye. At this distance, the brightness of the star is diminished from extinction caused by interstellar gas and dust.

The spectrum of 27 Aquilae fits a stellar classification of B9 III, with the luminosity class of III typically indicating this is an evolved giant star. As it  lies within the field of view of the CoRoT satellite, close observation have been made of its luminosity. The star shows a multiperiodic variability with at least six pulsation frequencies discovered. It has a high rate of rotation with a projected rotational velocity of 55 km/s. The outer atmosphere is radiating energy into space at an effective temperature of around 11,500 K, giving it the blue-white hue of a B-type star.

References

Aquila (constellation)
B-type giants
Aquilae, d
Aquilae, 27
181440
095073
7336
BD-01 3716